Let's Eat is the 32nd The Wiggles album released in 2010 by ABC Music distributed by Universal Music Australia. Featuring guest vocalists Keith Urban, Mic Conway, Tom McGlynn, Paul Field and the band  Mental As Anything. It was released on 1 July 2010 & won the 2010 ARIA for Best Children's album. The album cover imitates that of the Beatles' album Sgt. Pepper's Lonely Hearts Club Band.

Track listing

Video

Let's Eat was released on ABC DVD in 2010.

Song list
Let's Cook 
Clap Your Hands With Dorothy 
Monday Is Muffin Day! 
England Swings 
Alabama Jubilee 
Have a Laugh! (Funny Face) 
I Love Waffles in the Morning 
Tuesday Is Taco Day! 
Go Far, Big Red Car 
On Aunt Nellie's Farm 
Cook, Captain, Cook! 
Have a Laugh! (Handstand) 
Wednesday Is Watermelon Day! 
Dreidel, Dreidel, Dreidel 
Tom Love-Eatin' 
Clean Your Teeth 
Yellow Bird 
Thursday Is Bratwurst Day! 
Have a Laugh! (Wacky Dance) 
That's What You Call Digestion 
Sound Your Funky Horn 
Rag Mop 
Dorothy, Pick Roses with Me 
Friday Is Fish Fry Day! 
Have a Laugh! (Wobbly Walk) 
Squid Jiggin' Ground 
Sleep Safe, My Baby 
Wonderful Wags 
Saturday Is a Sultana Day! 
Wash Your Hands 
Sunday Is Sandwich Day!

References

External links

The Wiggles videos
The Wiggles albums
2010 albums
ARIA Award-winning albums
2010 video albums
Australian children's musical films